Belgium will compete at the 2022 World Athletics Championships in Eugene, United States, from 15 to 24 July 2022. Belgium has entered 32 athletes.

Medalists 

* – Indicates the athlete competed in preliminaries but not the final

Entrants
 including alternates
Key
Note–Ranks given for track events are within the athlete's heat only
Q = Qualified for the next round
q = Qualified for the next round as a fastest loser or, in field events, by position without achieving the qualifying target
NR = National record
CHB = Championship best
WL = World Leading
PB = Personal best
SB = Season's best
— = Round not applicable for the event
Bye = Athlete not required to compete in round
DNS = Did not start
NM = No valid trial recorded

Men

Track and road events

1Ran only in the heats

Field events

Women

Track and road events

1Ran only in the finale
2Reserve. Did not run in either the heats or final
3Ran only in the heats

Field events

Combined events – Heptathlon

Mixed
Track and road events

References

World Championships in Athletics
2022
Nations at the 2022 World Athletics Championships